Mimoniades is a Neotropical genus of skipper butterflies in the family Hesperiidae.

Large strong insects, the marking of which, on a black ground, corresponds to that of Jemadia, but the colour of the bands is a lighter or darker yellowish red, often with a brownish tint. The distal margin of the hindwing is only feebly undulate, but near the anal angle somewhat more distinctly dentate. On the forewing the lowest subcostal vein and the uppermost radial vein rise from the same place; the cell is shorter than half the costal margin, the transverse vein runs rectilinearly, the upper median and lower radial rise from the lower cell-angle.

Species
Mimoniades nurscia (Swainson, 1821) nursica skipper - type locality South America
Mimoniades nurscia nurscia (Swainson, 1821) Colombia, Ecuador, north Peru
Mimoniades nurscia malis (Godman & Salvin, 1879) Colombia
Mimoniades nurscia amans Skinner, 1920 Colombia, Peru
Mimoniades ocyalus Hübner, 1823 ocyalus skipper - south Brazil
Mimoniades versicolor (Latreille, [1824]) versicolor skipper - type locality Brazil
Mimoniades versicolor versicolor (Latreille, [1824]) Brazil
Mimoniades versicolor eupheme (Godman & Salvin, 1879) Ecuador, Peru, Bolivia
Mimoniades montana J. Zikán, 1938 quadricolor skipper - southeast Brazil
Mimoniades baroni (Godman & Salvin, 1895) Baron's skipper - Peru

References

Mimoniades - Natural History Museum Lepidoptera genus database

External links
images representing Mimoniades at Consortium for the Barcode of Life

Hesperiidae
Hesperiidae of South America
Hesperiidae genera